The Union League of Philadelphia is a private club founded in 1862 by the Old Philadelphians as a patriotic society to support the policies of Abraham Lincoln. As of 2022, the club has over 4,000 members. Its main building was built in 1865 and added to the National Register of Historic Places in 1979.

Union League clubs, which are legally separate but share similar histories and maintain reciprocal links with one another, are also located in Manhattan, Chicago, Brooklyn, and New Haven, Connecticut.

History
The Union League of Philadelphia was founded on November 22nd, 1862, as a patriotic society to support the Union and the policies of President Abraham Lincoln. It laid the philosophical foundation for other Union Leagues that were later developed during the American Civil War. The Union League has supported the United States Armed Forces in all conflicts since. Its motto is "Amor Patriae Ducit" or "Love of Country Leads." It is today the oldest of the remaining loyalty leagues.

19th and 20th centuries
Like most clubs of the 19th and early 20th century, the Union League of Philadelphia was only open to white men. However, in 1972, the club allowed its first Black member. The following decade, in the 1980s, it allowed its first female member. 

The club's Center City Philadelphia building, a Second Empire-style structure with a brick and brownstone façade, was designed by John Fraser and completed in May 1865. The opening was originally scheduled for March of that year, with President Lincoln in attendance, but was delayed due to wartime construction supply shortages. Christopher Stuart Patterson, formerly the Dean of the University of Pennsylvania Law School, was the 13th President of the Union League in 1897 and 1898. In 1905, Philadelphia architect and Union League member Horace Trumbauer won a design competition to build major additions to the building. The Beaux Arts-style additions, completed in 1910 and 1911, expanded the length of the building to an entire city block. The building was listed on the National Register of Historic Places in 1979.

The club's has a Heritage Center to store and display its extensive collection of Civil War-related documents and objects. It also maintains a large library for members.

21st century
In 2013, the Lincoln Ballroom in the Union League underwent a major restoration project. John Canning & Co., an architectural arts restoration company out of Cheshire, Connecticut, provided the decorative finishes on the new coffered ceiling that was reinstated based on a historic sketch by Horace Trumbauer.

In 2014, the club purchased the Torresdale-Frankford Country Club in Philadelphia, Pennsylvania, and renamed it the Union League Golf Club at Torresdale.

In 2017, the club purchased the Sand Barrens Golf Club in Swainton, New Jersey, and renamed it the Union League National Golf Club.

The club has been giving out scholarships and providing public education on Philadelphia and the American Civil War since the 1940s. In 2019, it combined these efforts by founding the Legacy Foundation with the goal of "inspiring more educated, engaged, and responsible citizens."

In 2021, the club purchased the Ace Club and Conference Center (formerly the Chubb Insurance Conference Center) in Lafayette Hill, Pennsylvania, and renamed it the Union League Golf Club at Liberty Hill.

In 2022, the Union League celebrated its 160th anniversary through 160 Acts of Patriotism in and around Philadelphia benefitting several local community based organizations.  The organization is considered to be politically conservative. It drew criticism from some prominent members for giving a gold medal, the same award it gave to Lincoln, to Florida Governor Ron DeSantis in 2022. Other recipients of the award include George H. W. Bush, George W. Bush, and Donald Rumsfeld. The club has awarded other figures in American politics and law, including Jeff Sessions, Clarence Thomas, and Samuel Alito.

Notable members
Members of the Philadelphia Union League included Cyrus McCormick, Robert Todd Lincoln, Adolph E. Borie, Daniel Burnham, William D. Boyce, Charles D. Barney, and George J. Smith.

Gallery

See also
 Union League Club of Chicago
 Union League Club of New York
 Union League Golf and Country Club
 List of American gentlemen's clubs
 Old Philadelphians

References
Notes

Bibliography
 Fleming, Walter L. ed. Documentary History of Reconstruction: Political, Military, Social, Religious, Educational, and Industrial (1906). vol 2 pp 1–29.
 Union League of Philadelphia, The League (1909)

External links

 
 The Heritage Center of The Union League of Philadelphia
 The Union League Club of New York
 The Union League Club of Chicago
 Union League Of Philadelphia Tour

1864 establishments in Pennsylvania
Clubhouses on the National Register of Historic Places in Philadelphia
Clubs and societies in the United States
Pennsylvania in the American Civil War
Gentlemen's clubs in the United States
Rittenhouse Square, Philadelphia
Organizations based in Philadelphia
Organizations established in 1862
1862 establishments in Pennsylvania
Conservative organizations in the United States